Üçkavak is a village in the Savur District of Mardin Province in Turkey. The village is populated by Arabs of the Kose tribe and Kurds from various tribal affiliations. It had a population of 1,155 in 2021.

References 

Villages in Savur District
Arab settlements in Mardin Province
Kurdish settlements in Mardin Province